Wdzydze Kiszewskie  is a village in the administrative district of Gmina Kościerzyna, within Kościerzyna County, Pomeranian Voivodeship, in northern Poland.

For details of the history of the region, see History of Pomerania.

The village has a population of 188.

Kashubian Ethnographic Park 
Wdzydze Kiszewskie is famous for its open-air museum, which is the oldest one in Poland. Kaszubski Park Etnograficzny is based on an old village of Kashubian fishermen. It was founded in 1906 by Theodora und Isidor Gulgowski. Nowadays, already over centennial Museum stretches upon 22 ha of area located at the bank of the Gołuń lake built up with objects of regional architecture. Cottages, manors, a school, smithy, windmills, churches, farm buildings and craftsmen's workshops – 49 objects. The museum shows the traditional culture of the Kashubians in several wooden houses.

References

External links
English website of the Kashubian Ethnographic Park

Wdzydze Kiszewskie